Kord Kheyl (also known as Kord Feyl) is a village in Larim Rural District, Gil Khuran District, Juybar County, Mazandaran Province, Iran. At the 2006 census, its population was 187, in 50 families.

See also 
 Modan (tribe)
 Kord Kola

References 

Populated places in Juybar County